Edward Brinton House is a historic home located in Birmingham Township, Chester County, Pennsylvania. The house was built in 1839, and is a -story, five bay, double pile, Georgian-style fieldstone dwelling with a gable roof.  It has a -story stone summer kitchen addition.

It was added to the National Register of Historic Places in 1973.

References

Houses completed in 1839
Houses on the National Register of Historic Places in Pennsylvania
Georgian architecture in Pennsylvania
Houses in Chester County, Pennsylvania
National Register of Historic Places in Chester County, Pennsylvania